Fotbal Club Victoria Bardar , commonly known as Victoria Bardar, or simply Victoria, is a Moldovan football club based in Bardar, Moldova. The club was founded in 1995 and currently plays in the Moldovan Liga 1.

Achievements
Moldovan Liga 1
 Winners (1): 2017

Moldovan Liga 2
 Winners (2): 2010–11, 2011–12 (Center)

Moldovan Cup
Quarter finals: 2013–14

References

External links
Victoria Bardar at soccerway
Victoria Bardar  at weltfussballarchiv.com
Victoria Bardar pe divizia-a.com
Victoria Bardar  pe sport1.md

Football clubs in Moldova
Association football clubs established in 1995
1995 establishments in Moldova